The  1936 German football championship, the 29th edition of the competition, was won by 1. FC Nürnberg by defeating Fortuna Düsseldorf 2–1 after extra time in the final. It was Nuremberg's sixth championship and its first since 1927. Fortuna Düsseldorf made its second final appearance, having previously won the competition in 1933 but, after 1936, the team would never appear in the final again. Nuremberg had eliminated the champions of the previous two seasons, Schalke 04 in the semi-finals, making 1936 the only final from 1933 to 1942 not to include the club. Schalke however would return to its winning ways the following season when it defeated Nuremberg in the 1937 final.

PSV Chemnitz's Erwin Helmchen was the top scorer of the 1936 championship with ten goals.

It was the last German championship final in Berlin to be played at a venue other than the Olympiastadion, the latter having been built for the 1936 Summer Olympics and being used for all finals from 1937 to 1944 and six more after the Second World War.

The sixteen 1935–36 Gauliga champions competed in a group stage of four groups of four teams each, with the group winners advancing to the semi-finals. The two semi-final winners then contested the 1936 championship final. The 1936 season saw the introduction of a game for third place, played between the two losing semi-finalists.

Qualified teams
The teams qualified through the 1935–36 Gauliga season:

Competition

Group 1
Group 1 was contested by the champions of the Gauligas Brandenburg, Ostpreußen, Sachsen and Westfalen:

Group 2
Group 2 was contested by the champions of the Gauligas Nordmark, Niedersachsen, Pommern and Schlesien:

Group 3
Group 3 was contested by the champions of the Gauligas Bayern, Mitte, Südwest and Württemberg:

Group 4
Group 4 was contested by the champions of the Gauligas Baden, Hessen, Mittelrhein and Niederrhein:

Semi-finals

|align="center" style="background:#ddffdd" colspan=3|7 June 1936

|}

Third place play-off

|align="center" style="background:#ddffdd" colspan=3|20 June 1936

|}

Final

|align="center" style="background:#ddffdd" colspan=3|21 June 1936

|}

References

Sources
 kicker Allmanach 1990, by kicker, page 164 & 177 - German championship

External links
 German Championship 1935–36 at weltfussball.de 
 German Championship 1936 at RSSSF

1
German
German football championship seasons